The Kish grid or Kish selection grid is a method for selecting members within a household to be interviewed.  It uses a pre-assigned table of random numbers to find the person to be interviewed.  It was developed by statistician Leslie Kish in 1949.

It is a technique widely used in survey research. However, in telephone surveys, the next-birthday method (asking to interview whoever in the household is closest to having their next birthday) is sometimes preferred to the Kish grid.

References

Notes

Sources

Sampling techniques